Acacia amblygona, commonly known as fan wattle or fan leaf wattle, is a shrub belonging to the genus Acacia and the subgenus Phyllodineae that is native to Australia.

Description
The branchlets are terete with fine ridges and light to densely hairy. It blooms from July to October and produces yellow flowers.

Taxonomy
The species was first formally described in 1842 by the botanist George Bentham in William Jackson Hooker's Notes on Mimoseae, with a synopsis of species published in the London Journal of Botany. The species was reclassified in 1987 by Leslie Pedley as Racosperma amblygonum then transferred back into the genus Acacia in 2001. Other synonyms include Acacia nernstii.

Distribution
In Western Australia it is native to an area along the south coast near Ravensthorpe in the Goldfields-Esperance region of Western Australia where it grows in stony soil. It is found in coastal and inland parts of New South Wales north from Lake Cargelligo and extends into southern parts of Queensland.

See also
List of Acacia species

References

amblygona
Acacias of Western Australia
Plants described in 1842
Flora of New South Wales
Flora of Queensland
Taxa named by George Bentham